Duanzhou railway station is a railway station in Duanzhou District, Zhaoqing, Guangdong, China. It is an intermediate station on the Guangzhou–Foshan–Zhaoqing intercity railway. It opened with the line on 30 March 2016. The station has two side platforms.

References 

Railway stations in Guangdong
Railway stations in China opened in 2016